Weddington may refer to:

Individuals 

 Sarah Weddington (19452021), attorney in the Roe vs. Wade abortion case, former member of the Texas House of Representatives from Austin
 Susan Weddington, state chairman of the Republican Party of Texas from 1997 to 2003
 W. Carlton Weddington (born 1970), a former Ohio state legislator convicted of bribery in 2012

Places 

 Weddington, Arkansas, United States
 Weddington, Kent, a location in England
 Weddington, North Carolina, United States
 Weddington, Nuneaton, an area of Nuneaton, Warwickshire, England, United Kingdom

Music 

 "Weddington Street", a song by Frank Gambale from his 1985 album Brave New Guitar